Chen Zheyuan (born October 29, 1996), is a Chinese actor and singer. He is best known for his roles in the wuxia drama Handsome Siblings (2020) and the new modern drama Our Secret (2021).

Biography
In 2015, Chen participated in the variety program King of Pop, and subsequently debuted as part of the boy group Mr. Bio.

In 2017, Chen made his acting debut in the youth drama All About Secrets , based on the novel by Rao Xueman. In 2018, Chen starred in the fantasy wuxia drama  The Legend of Zu 2. The same year, he made his big screen debut in the comedy film Miss Puff. He then starred in the costume comedy drama  Hello Dear Ancestors, and suspense web drama Detective Chinatown.

In 2020, Chen became known to audiences after starring in wuxia drama  Handsome Siblings, based on the novel Juedai Shuangjiao by Gu Long. He was praised for his portrayal of the protagonist, Xiao Yu'er. The same year, he was cast in the historical drama Winner Is King , based on the novel Sha Po Lang'' by Priest alongside Tan Jianci. He is set to play the male lead, Chang Geng.

Filmography

Film

Television Series

Television Show

Discography

Awards and nominations

References

1996 births
Living people
Chinese male film actors
Chinese male television actors
21st-century Chinese male singers
Male actors from Guangdong
Chinese idols